John Rustad  (born 1963) is a Canadian member of the Legislative Assembly of the Canadian province of British Columbia. He currently represents the constituency of Nechako Lakes, which he has held since the 2009 election. 

He was first elected in 2005 representing the riding of Prince George-Omineca, which was dissolved in 2009 and replaced by the current Nechako Lakes riding. Rustad was re-elected to represent the riding in 2013 and was appointed Minister of Aboriginal Relations and Reconciliation on June 10, 2013 by Premier Christy Clark. He previously served as Parliamentary Secretary for Forestry to the Minister of Forests, Lands and Natural Resource Operations and as a member of the Environment and Land Use Committee, Legislative Review Committee, Treasury Board, Select Standing Committee on Education, Select Standing Committee on Public Accounts and Select Standing Committee on Health. 

Rustad was born and raised in Prince George and has lived all of his life in northern B.C. He grew up enjoying fishing and hunting. In 2009, he and his wife Kim moved to Cluculz Lake.

On August 18, 2022, Rustad was removed from the BC Liberal caucus by leader Kevin Falcon after Rustad suggested online that carbon dioxide emissions were not contributing to climate change.

On February 16, 2023, Rustad joined the BC Conservative Party, giving the party representation in the Legislature. Rustad cited "irreconcilable differences" with Falcon in explaining his party change.

Electoral record

References

1963 births
British Columbia Liberal Party MLAs
Living people
Members of the Executive Council of British Columbia
People from Prince George, British Columbia
Politicians affected by a party expulsion process
21st-century Canadian politicians